Marc Keller (born 14 January 1968) is a French former professional footballer who played primarily as a midfielder. In his club career he played in France, Germany and England. For the national side he played seven times, scoring one goal against Brazil. He later became general director of RC Strasbourg and AS Monaco.

Club career

Early career
Keller began his career in France playing for Mulhouse. In 1991 he moved to Strasbourg whom he helped win the 1995 UEFA Intertoto Cup, scoring a hat-trick in the second leg of the final against FC Tirol Innsbruck. In 1996 he moved to Germany to play for Karlsruher SC.

West Ham United
Keller was signed by West Ham in July 1998 on a free transfer from Karlsruher SC by manager Harry Redknapp. He made his debut on 12 September 1998 in a 2–1 home win against Liverpool coming on as a substitute for John Hartson. His first West Ham goal came on 22 November 1998 in a 2–0 away win against Derby County. Keller played 22 games in his first season in all competitions scoring five goals as West Ham finished in fifth place in the Premier League to qualify for the Intertoto Cup.

The following season, he played four games in the tournament including the second leg of the final away against FC Metz. West Ham won the game 3–1 to win the trophy 3–2 on aggregate, this being the second time Keller had won the tournament having also won it four years previously at Strasbourg. West Ham therefore qualified for the UEFA Cup as one of the three winners of the competition for that season. Keller played in three of West Ham's four games in the UEFA Cup and 34 games with one goal in all competitions during the 2000–01 season. However, in the 2001–02 season he played just a single game, against Walsall in the League Cup. In September 2000 Keller was sent on loan to Portsmouth, then playing in  Division One. He played three games before returning to West Ham. In January 2001 he was allowed to leave, on a free transfer, to Blackburn Rovers. This was part of a deal which saw Christian Dailly move to West Ham for £1.7 million.

Blackburn Rovers
Keller played only five games for Blackburn Rovers, two in the league and three in the FA Cup, all as substitute appearances. His last game came on 7 March 2001, a 3–0 home win against Bolton Wanderers, when he was a 73rd-minute substitute for Damien Duff. It was his last game in professional football.

International career
Keller made his debut for France in January 1993 in a friendly match in Dakar against Senegal coming on as a 72nd-minute substitute for Corentin Martins. He played seven times for France, scoring once. On 3 June 1997 in a match in Le Tournoi, Keller equalised an earlier goal by Roberto Carlos in a 1–1 draw against Brazil. His last game was in March 1998 against Russia.

References

External links
 Player profile at Sporting Heroes
 

1968 births
Living people
French footballers
French expatriate footballers
Footballers from Alsace
Sportspeople from Colmar
France international footballers
FC Mulhouse players
RC Strasbourg Alsace players
Ligue 1 players
Ligue 2 players
Karlsruher SC players
West Ham United F.C. players
Portsmouth F.C. players
Blackburn Rovers F.C. players
Premier League players
Bundesliga players
Expatriate footballers in England
Expatriate footballers in Germany
English Football League players
French expatriate sportspeople in England
French expatriate sportspeople in Germany
Association football midfielders